Miguel Bernal Montes (born 1993), better known online as Mikecrack, is a Spanish YouTuber, computer animator and singer known for his let's plays of video games, as well as his animations and musical parodies.

Biography and career 
Having studied four years at Juan Tamariz's magician school, Bernal started a YouTube channel in 2009 where he would upload magic tricks. He later left that channel to study biomedical technology in university, where he graduated in 2015. While studying for a master's degree in February 2016, he uploaded his first video to a new YouTube channel focused on gaming content.

Bernal's channel mainly focuses on videos related to the video game Minecraft; he also uploads music parodies and animated videos. A prominent aspect of his videos is his on-screen persona named Mike, an animated dog character similar in likeness to Adventure Times Jake the Dog.

Bernal created a team called Los #CoMPas with Spanish YouTubers ElTrollino, Timba Vk and Sparta356. The team frequently recorded videos together.

In 2020, Forbes Spain named Bernal in their list of the top 100 influencers in Spain for the year.

In 2021 he passed 30 million subscribers and become the third channel in Spain by subscribers.
He also created an original animated series named "Las Perrerías de Mike".

Awards

References 

1993 births
Music YouTubers
Spanish YouTubers
YouTube channels launched in 2009
Minecraft YouTubers
Gaming YouTubers
Living people
People from Madrid